Claudio Tommaso Gnoli (born 19 March 1969 in Milan, Italy) is an Italian information scientist, son of Franco Adolfo Giorgio Gnoli and Francesca Vittoria Bruni. He is mainly interested in knowledge organization (KO), in particular in such ontological views as emergentist evolutionism, the theory of levels of reality and General System Theory, as philosophical foundations for both existing and new KO systems, and in testing the potential of a classification by phenomena (meant as the objects of knowledge) as opposed to disciplines.

Araujo and Guimarães (2016)  in a bibliometric study identified Gnoli as one a central researcher and showed his relations to other researchers within knowledge organization.

Career
 2009-: Science and Technology Library, University of Pavia
 2000-2009: Library, Department of Mathematics, University of Pavia
 1994-2000: Library, Faculty of Agriculture, University of Milan
 1994-1994: Public Library, Municipality of Mariano Comense

Professional Societies
Claudio Gnoli has been a member of the 
 International Society for Knowledge Organization since 2003-
 UDCC: Universal Decimal Classification Consortium member of advisory board 2007- 
 NKOS: Networked Knowkedge Organization Systems/Services [informal group] Participant since 2008-  
 BARTOC: Basel Register of Thesauri, Ontologies & Classifications. Member of editorial board since 2016-  
 AIB: Associazione italiana biblioteche. Member 1998–2012.

Selected publications in English
Claudio Gnoli is co-editor and webeditor of ISKO Encyclopedia of Knowledge Organization (IEKO): http://www.isko.org/cyclo/

Gnoli, Claudio. 2020. Introduction to Knowledge Organization. London: Facet Publishing.

Gnoli, Claudio. 2018. “Mentefacts as a missing level in theory of information science”. ‘’Journal of Documentation’’ 74, no. 6: 1226-1242. DI 10.1108/JD-04-2018-0054

Gnoli, Claudio. 2018. “Classifying Phenomena Part 4: Themes and Rhemes”.  ‘’Knowledge Organization’’ 45, no. 1: 43-53. DI 10.5771/0943-7444-2018-1-43

Lardera, Marco, Gnoli, Claudio, Rolandi, Clara and Trzmielewski, Marcin. 2017. “Developing SciGator, a DDC-Based Library Browsing Tool”. ‘’Knowledge Organization’’ 44, no. 8: 638-643.

Gnoli, Claudio. 2017. “Classifying Phenomena Part 2: Types and Levels”. ‘’Knowledge Organization’’ 44, no. 1: 37-54.

Gnoli, Claudio. 2016. “What is Knowledge Organization About?”. ‘’Knowledge Organization’’ 43, no. 8: 668-669.

Gnoli, Claudio. 2016. “Classifying Phenomena Part 1: Dimensions”. ‘’Knowledge Organization’’ 43, no. 6: 403-415.

Gnoli, Claudio and Ridi, Riccardo. 2014. “Unified Theory of Information, hypertextuality and levels of reality”. ‘’Journal of Documentation’’ 70, no. 3: 443-460. DI 10.1108/JD-09-2012-0115

Gnoli, Claudio. 2012. “Metadata About What? Distinguishing Between Ontic, Epistemic, and Documental Dimensions in Knowledge Organization”. ‘’Knowledge Organization’’ 39, no. 4: 268-275.DI 10.5771/0943-7444-2012-4-268

Gnoli, Claudio. 2010. “Classification Transcends Library Business”. ‘’Knowledge Organization’’ 37, no. 3: 223-229. DI 10.5771/0943-7444-2010-3-223

Gnoli, Claudio. 2010. “Levels, types, facets: three structural principles for KO”. ‘’Advances in Knowledge Organization’’ 12, 129-137.

Gnoli, Claudio. 2009. “Phylogenetic Classification Revisited”. ‘’Knowledge Organization’’ 36, no. 1: 78.

Gnoli, Claudio. 2008. “Facets: A Fruitful Notion in Many Domains”. ‘’Axiomathes’’ 18, no. 2: 127-130. DI 10.1007/s10516-008-9032-5

Gnoli, Claudio. 2008. “Categories and Facets in Integrative Levels”. ‘’Axiomathes’’  18, no. 2: 177-192. DI 10.1007/s10516-007-9022-z

Gnoli, Claudio. 2008. “Ten long-term research questions in knowledge organization”. ‘’Knowledge Organization’’ 35, nos. 2-3: 137-149. DI 10.5771/0943-7444-2008-2-3-137

Gnoli, Claudio. 2006. “Phylogenetic classification”. ‘’Knowledge Organization’’ 33, no. 3: 138-152.

Gnoli, Claudio. 2004. “Knowledge organization in Italy”. ‘’Knowledge Organization’’ 31, no. 1: 64-66.

Gnoli, Claudio and Poli, Roberto. 2004. “Levels of reality and levels of representation”. ‘’Knowledge Organization’’ 31, no. 3: 151–160.

List of publications: https://www-dimat.unipv.it/gnoli/worksy.php

References

External links
List of publications: https://www-dimat.unipv.it/gnoli/worksy.php

Personal web site: https://www-dimat.unipv.it/gnoli/

1969 births
Italian information theorists
Italian librarians
Living people